Christian August von Eyben (30 August 1700, Schleswig - 21 January 1785, Lübeck ) was a German lawyer and dean of the Bishopric of Lübeck.

Life
From a family of lawyers and diplomats, Christian was the son of the diplomat Christian Wilhelm von Eyben and uncle to Hulderich von Eyben and Weipart Ludwig von Fabrice. After a grand tour with his elder brother Friedrich, in 1723 he entered the service of the prince-bishop of Lübeck Christian August as a squire - the bishop was laos his godfather. He was an assessor in the Justizkanzlei, the Rentkammer and the Consistory and rose to be chief steward to Christian August's wife Albertine Friederike von Baden-Durlach - his father had entered public life in the service of Albertine's father Frederick VII, Margrave of Baden-Durlach. In 1729 Christian became a canon of Lübeck Cathedral and in 1763 its dean.

Marriage and issue
In Braunschweig Cathedral in 1735 he married Elisabeth Sophia Maria von Hassberge (1717–1782). They had eight children:
 Elisabet von Eyben (1736–1780), from 1766 first lady of the bedchamber to queen Caroline Matilda   
 Friedrich Ludwig von Eyben (1738–1793), Danish ambassador to Naples and Regensburg
 Christian Wilhelm von Eyben (1741–1774)     
 Adolf Gottlieb von Eyben (1741–1811), adopted by Friedrich von Eyben, chancellor in Glückstadt
 Albertine Friederike von Eyben (1743–1809)
 Joachim Werner von Eyben (1746–1811), officer, later colonel in Oldenburg
 Charlotte Christiane Augusta von Eyben (1748–1830), entered the Kloster Lüne
 August Wilhelm Gottlob von Eyben  (1751–nach 1804), Russian state councillor

Christian August and his wife were buried in a north-west ambulatory chapel in Lübeck Cathedral.

Honours
 1742 Order of St Anne
 1756 Order of the Dannebrog

Bibliography
 Johann Friedrich Jugler: Beyträge zur juristischen Biographie... Leipzig: Heinsius 1773, S. 209-214

External links

 Genealogy

References

1700 births
1785 deaths
German politicians